The Dobrovăț Monastery is a Romanian Orthodox monastery located in Dobrovăț-Ruși, Iași County, Romania. The monastery is listed in the National Register of Historic Monuments.

History
It was completed in 1504 by Bogdan III, son of Stephen. The paintings inside the church of the monastic complex were executed during the reign of Petru Rareș Voivode, another son of Stephen the Great, between 1527 and 1530.

References

External links

 The history of Dobrovăţ Monastery 

Historic monuments in Iași County
Romanian Orthodox monasteries of Iași County
Christian monasteries established in the 16th century
Churches established by Stephen the Great
1504 establishments in Romania
16th-century architecture in Romania